Gazgisheh (also Romanized as Gazgīsheh and Gaz Gīsheh; also known as Kāz Kīsheh) is a village in Hend Khaleh Rural District, Tulem District, Sowme'eh Sara County, Gilan Province, Iran. At the 2006 census, its population was 312, in 92 families.

References 

Populated places in Sowme'eh Sara County